The East Trenton Public Library, in Trenton, New Jersey, was built as the Samuel Dickinson house, c. 1796 at the center of a large farm.  In 1926 it became a public library, in which capacity it continues to serve.

See also
National Register of Historic Places listings in Mercer County, New Jersey

References

Public libraries in New Jersey
National Register of Historic Places in Trenton, New Jersey
New Jersey Register of Historic Places